This is a list of homological algebra topics, by Wikipedia page.

Basic techniques

Cokernel
Exact sequence
Chain complex
Differential module
Five lemma
Short five lemma
Snake lemma
Nine lemma
Extension (algebra)
Central extension
Splitting lemma
Projective module
Injective module
Projective resolution
Injective resolution
Koszul complex
Exact functor
Derived functor
Ext functor
Tor functor
Filtration (abstract algebra)
Spectral sequence
Abelian category
Triangulated category
Derived category

Applications

Group cohomology
Galois cohomology
Lie algebra cohomology
Sheaf cohomology
Whitehead problem
Homological conjectures in commutative algebra

Homological algebra